Kurt Linder (8 October 1933 – 12 December 2022) was a German professional football manager and player. He played for Young Boys, Rapid Wien, Rot-Weiss Essen and Lyon, among other teams.

After his playing career, Linder became a professional manager in Switzerland with Lausanne-Sport and Young Boys, in Netherlands with XerxesDZB, PSV Eindhoven and Ajax, and in France with Marseille.

As a player he won the league titles of Switzerland and Austria with Young Boys and Rapid Wien respectively, while as a manager Linder won the Swiss Cup and Swiss League Cup with Young Boys and the Eredivisie with Ajax in the 1981-82 season with 117 goals for and 42 goals against in 34 matches, with players like Keje Molenaar, Frank Rijkaard, Sonny Silooy, Gerald Vanenburg, Johan Cruijff, Soren Lerby, Tscheu La Ling, Wim Kieft, Jesper Olsen, Marco van Basten and John van 't Schip.

Linder died on 12 December 2022, at the age of 89.

Honours

Player
Young Boys
Swiss Super League: 1956–57

Rapid Wien
Austrian Staatsliga: 1959–60

Manager
Young Boys
Swiss Cup: 1976–77
Swiss League Cup: 1976

Ajax
Eredivisie: 1981–82

References

Bibliography

External links 
Manager profile
weltfussball

1933 births
2022 deaths
Footballers from Karlsruhe
German footballers
Association football forwards
Karlsruher SC players
SK Rapid Wien players
Rot-Weiss Essen players
Olympique Lyonnais players
Ligue 1 players
German football managers
German expatriate football managers
FC Lausanne-Sport managers
PSV Eindhoven managers
Olympique de Marseille managers
BSC Young Boys managers
Urania Genève Sport players
AFC Ajax managers
German expatriate footballers
Expatriate footballers in Austria
German expatriate sportspeople in Austria
Expatriate footballers in France
German expatriate sportspeople in France
German expatriate sportspeople in the Netherlands
German expatriate sportspeople in Switzerland